Scenic is a cruise line offering cruises and tours, founded by Australian businessman Glen Moroney in 1986. In 2007, Scenic opened its first UK office, with its UK headquarters in Manchester. Its inaugural European river cruise took place a year later with the launch of its first river ship, Scenic Sapphire.

As of August 2019, Scenic operates 15 river cruise ships, offering river cruises in Europe, Russia and South East Asia. On 15 August, Scenic launched its first purpose-built ocean cruise ship, Scenic Eclipse, which provides cruises in the Americas, Europe, the Arctic, Antarctica, and the Norwegian Fjords. In 2018, Scenic confirmed its plans to build a sister ship for Scenic Eclipse, which is expected to launch in 2020.

Company History 
Scenic was established by Glen Moroney in 1987. Scenic offered its first cruises on the rivers of Europe in 2008, with the launch of the brand’s first river cruise ship, Scenic Sapphire. This was followed shortly by the Scenic Emerald, with the Scenic Diamond, and Scenic Ruby arriving in 2009.

In 2012, Scenic launched a new ship, the Scenic Tsar, which became the first new passenger vessel to be registered on the Moscow—St Petersburg passage in 25 years. The Scenic Tsar offers cruises on the River Volga between Moscow and St Petersburg, with excursions to the island of Kizhi.

Scenic established Emerald Waterways as a lower-cost river cruise line in 2013.

In 2014, Scenic added a further two ships to its fleet, with the addition of the 169-passenger Scenic Jade, which offers cruises on the River Danube, and the 126-passenger Scenic Gem, which cruises on the River Seine.

In 2015, Scenic confirmed that four new ships were in production and scheduled to enter service in 2016. The new ships included: Scenic Azure, which was custom-built to cruise the waters of the River Douro in Portugal; Scenic Amber, which would launch onto Europe’s main rivers; and two new ships purpose-built for the Irrawaddy and Mekong rivers in South East Asia, the Scenic Aura and Scenic Spirit.

In January 2016, Scenic announced its plans to enter the ocean cruise market with the launch of Scenic Eclipse, a 228-passenger ocean liner scheduled to enter service in August 2019. In February 2018, the cruise line confirmed that a sister ship to the Scenic Eclipse was in production, with a prospective launch date of 2020.

As of 2019, Scenic is in the process of redesigning 10 ships. These ships include Scenic Diamond, Scenic Sapphire, Scenic Ruby, Scenic Peal, Scenic Jasper, Scenic Opal, Scenic Amber, Scenic Crystal, Scenic Jade and Scenic Jewel.

Cruises and Destinations 
Scenic offers cruises on nine rivers, including all the major rivers of Europe, the Irrawaddy and Mekong rivers in South East Asia and the Volga in Russia. With the Scenic Eclipse’s launch, Scenic offers a range of itineraries to destinations across the world, including Antarctica, the Arctic, the Americas, the Mediterranean, the Baltic, British Isles, and Norwegian Fjords.

Current Fleet 

Expedition ship

References 

Cruise lines
River cruise companies